Scotorythra ortharcha is a moth of the family Geometridae. It was first described by Edward Meyrick in 1899. It is endemic to the island of Hawaii.

External links

O
Endemic moths of Hawaii